Pilophorini is a tribe of plant bug. The type genus is Pilophorus (Hahn, 1826). Schuh's analysis indicates that the Pilophorini originated in tropical Gondwanaland and subsequently spread into the temperate Northern Hemisphere, where they differentiated into the known genera.

Genera
 Tribe Pilophorini Douglas & Scott, 1876
 Genus Alepidiella Poppius, 1914 - Eastern Nearctic
 Genus Aloea Linnavuori, 1975 - Africa, Middle East
 Genus Dilatops Weirauch, 2006 - Australia, Oceania
 Genus Druthmarus Distant, 1909 - Orient
 Genus Ethatractus Linnavuori, 1975 - Africa
 Genus Hypseloecus Reuter, 1891 - Paleotropics, Australia
 Genus Lasiolabops Poppius, 1914 - Paleotropics
 Genus Neoambonea Schuh, 1974 - Africa
 Genus Parambonea Schuh, 1974 - Africa
 Genus Parasthenaridea Miller, 1937 - Orient
 Genus Pherolepis Kulik, 1968 - Eastern Palearctic
 Genus Pilophorus Hahn, 1826 - Holarctic, Orient
 Genus Pseudambonea Schuh, 1974 - Africa
 Genus Randallophorus Henry, 2013 - Neotropics
 Genus Spinolosus Zou, 1985 - Orient
 Genus Sthenaridea Reuter, 1885 - Circumtropical

Notes

References
 Encyclopedia of Life entry
 
 
 
  
 
  in Chinese with English descriptions of the new 
taxa

Phylinae
Hemiptera tribes